Zhoř is a municipality and village in Písek District in the South Bohemian Region of the Czech Republic. It has about 300 inhabitants.

Administrative parts
Villages of Blehov, Březí, Osletín and Zbislav are administrative parts of Zhoř.

References

Villages in Písek District